Arrival is the 5th album by Rosie Gaines, released in February 1997. It was the debut album on her label, Dredlix Records, and was an internet-only release.

Track listing
All tracks written by Rosie Gaines, Dana Bailey and Francis Jules except where noted.
 "Arrival" – 7:07
 "Want an Angel" – 6:16
 "Junkies on the Corner" – 3:39
 "We Can't Go On Like This" – 4:01
 "Stomp" – 5:04
 "Don't Let 'Em" – 6:04
 "Yeah" – 5:48
 "Beautiful World" – 6:25
 "Shake Out the Blue" – 3:33
 "Sun Moon" – 4:56

Singles
"Stomp" digital single
Stomp (Radio Version)

"Don't Let 'Em"
Various versions

External links
 Official Arrival album page

Rosie Gaines albums
1990 albums